Simone Veil  (13 July 1927 – 30 June 2017) was a French magistrate and politician who served as Health Minister in several governments and was President of the European Parliament from 1979 to 1982, the first woman to hold that office. As health minister, she is best remembered for advancing women's rights in France, in particular for the 1975 law that legalized abortion, today known as Veil Act. From 1998 to 2007, she was a member of the Constitutional Council, France’s highest legal authority.

A Holocaust survivor, of both Auschwitz-Birkenau and Bergen-Belsen, she was a firm believer in European integration as a way of guaranteeing peace. She served as president of the Fondation pour la Mémoire de la Shoah, from 2000 to 2007, then subsequently as honorary president. Among many honours, she was made an honorary dame in 1998, was elected to the Académie Française in 2008, and in 2012 received the grand cross of the Légion d’honneur, the highest class of the highest French order of merit.

One of France’s most revered figures, Simone Veil and her husband were buried at the Panthéon on 1 July 2018. Her eulogy was given by President Emmanuel Macron.

Early years and family
Simone Jacob was born in Nice in south-east France on 13 July 1927, in an atheist Jewish family. Her father André Jacob was an architect who graduated from the Beaux-Arts de Paris and went on to win the Prix de Rome for Architecture. In 1922 he married Yvonne Steinmetz, who had just passed her Baccalaureate and was about to start studying chemistry. André Jacob insisted that she abandon her studies upon marriage. The family moved from Paris to Nice in 1924,  hoping to benefit from construction projects on the Côte d’Azur. Simone was the youngest of four siblings, Madeleine (nicknamed Milou) was born in 1923; Denise in 1924 and Jean in 1925. 
On her father’s side, the family had come from Lorraine, on her mother’s from the Rhineland region and from Belgium.

Simone's family was explicitly Jewish but non-practicing. "Being a member of the Jewish community was never a problem. It was proudly claimed by my father, but for cultural reasons, not religious ones," she wrote in her autobiography.  "In his eyes, if the Jewish people were to remain the chosen people, it was because they were the people of the Book, the people of thinking and writing."

Deportation
When Germany invaded France and the Vichy regime came to power in June 1940, the family managed to avoid being deported, as Nice had been included in the Italian occupation zone. Asked not to come to school by its superintendent, Simone Jacob had to study at home. As the round-up of Jews intensified, the whole family split up and lived with different friends under false identities. Denise left for Lyon to join the resistance, while 16-year-old Simone kept studying and passed her baccalaureate exam under her real name in March 1944. The next day, as she was on her way out to meet friends and celebrate the end of her secondary education, she was arrested by the Gestapo. On the same day, the rest of the family was also rounded up.

On 7 April 1944, Simone, her mother, and her sisters were sent to the transit camp of Drancy, then on 13 April were deported to Auschwitz in Convoy 71. Simone’s brother and father were deported to the Baltic states in Convoy 73, never to be seen again, and thus were assumed to have been murdered. Her sister Denise was deported to Ravensbrück concentration camp, which she survived, and after the end of World War II in Europe was reunited with Simone. 

On 15 April 1944, Simone Jacob arrived at Auschwitz. She later wrote that she managed to avoid the gas chamber by lying about her age and was registered for the labour camp. In January 1945, Simone, along with her mother and sister, was sent on a march to Bergen-Belsen concentration camp, where her mother died of typhus. Madeleine also fell ill but, like Simone, was saved when the camp was liberated on 15 April 1945.

Return to France
Simone Jacob returned to France and started studying law at the University of Paris before going to the Institut d'études politiques, where she met Antoine Veil. The couple married on 26 October 1946, and would go on to have three sons, Jean, Nicolas, and Pierre-François. They moved to Germany, where they lived in the American occupied zone. In 1952, Madeleine Jacob died with her son in a car accident, after visiting Simone in Stuttgart. In 1956, Simone gave up working as a lawyer and instead passed the national examination to become a magistrate.

Political career

Ministry of Justice, 1956–1974
After graduating from the Institut d'études politiques de Paris with a law degree, Veil spent several years practising law. In 1954, she passed the national examination to become a magistrate. She entered the National Penitentiary Administration under the Ministry of Justice, where she held a senior position, being responsible for judicial affairs and improved women's prison conditions and the treatment of incarcerated women. In 1964, she left to become the director of civil affairs, where she improved French women's general rights and status. She successfully achieved the right to dual parental control of family legal matters and adoptive rights for women. In 1970, she became secretary general of the Supreme Magistracy Council (:fr:Conseil supérieur de la magistrature).

Minister of Health, 1974–1979
From 1974 to 1979, Veil was a Minister of Health in the governments of prime ministers Jacques Chirac and Raymond Barre: from 28 May 1974 to 29 March 1977, Minister of Health; from 29 March 1977 to 3 April 1978, Minister of Health and Social Security; and from 3 April 1978 to 4 July 1979, Minister of Health and Family.

She pushed forward two notable laws. The first, passed on 4 December 1974, facilitated access to contraception, the sale of contraceptives such as the combined oral contraceptive pill, which was legalized in 1967.

The second, passed on 17 January 1975, legalized abortion in France - this was her hardest fought political initiative and the one for which she is best known. The abortion debate was particularly difficult for her because those in favor of keeping abortion illegal launched aggressive personal attacks against Veil and her family. However, since the passing of the law, many have paid tribute to Veil and thanked her for her courageous and determined fight.

In 1976, Veil also helped to introduce a ban on smoking in certain public places and worked on the problem of medically underserved rural areas.

European Parliament, 1979–1993
In 1979, Veil was elected as a Member of the European Parliament in the first European parliamentary election. In its first session, the new Parliament elected Veil as its first President, a position she held until 1982. The archives concerning her term as President of the European Parliament are deposited at the Historical Archives of the European Union in Florence.

In 1981, Veil won the prestigious Charlemagne Prize, an award given to honour the contributions made by individuals to advancing the unity of Europe.

After the end of her term as President, in 1982, she remained a member of the European Parliament. She became Chair of the European Liberal Democrat and Reform Party until 1989. She was re-elected for the last time in the 1989 election, standing down in 1993.

Between 1984 and 1992, she served on the Committee on the Environment, Public Health and Food Safety, and the Committee on Political Affairs. After standing down from these committees, she served on the Committee on Foreign Affairs and its related Subcommittee on Human Rights. Between 1989 and 1993, she was also a member of Parliament's delegation to the ACP-EU Joint Parliamentary Assembly, serving as its vice-chairwoman until 1992.

Return to French Government, 1993–1995
From 31 March 1993 to 16 May 1995, Veil was again a member of the cabinet, serving as Minister of State and Minister of Health, Social Affairs and the city in the government of Prime Minister Édouard Balladur.
In the mid-1990s, she worked to help the disabled, HIV-positive patients, and mothers of young children.

Member of the Constitutional Council, 1998
In 1998, she was appointed to the Constitutional Council of France. In 2005, she put herself briefly on leave from the council in  order to campaign in favour of the Treaty establishing a Constitution for Europe. This action was criticized because it seemed to contradict the legal provisions that members of the council should keep a distance from partisan politics: the independence and impartiality of the council would be jeopardized, critics said, if members could put themselves "on leave" in order to campaign for a project. In response, Veil said that she, the president of the Constitutional Council and colleagues had deliberated on the issue beforehand and they had given her permission to take her leave without having to resign. Being a staunch supporter of the European project, she believed others should not "ignore the historical dimension of European integration".

Later life and death
 

In 2003, she was elected to the Board of Directors of the International Criminal Court's Trust Fund for Victims. 
In 2007, Simone Veil supported presidential candidate Nicolas Sarkozy. She was by his side on the day after he received 31 percent of the vote in the first round of the presidential elections that year.

Simone Veil was the sixth woman to be elected to the Académie française, in 2008. She joined the Academy's forty "immortals", as the members are informally known, occupying the 13th seat, once the seat of literary figure Jean Racine. Her induction address was given in March 2010 by Jean d'Ormesson. On her sword, given to her as to every other immortal, is engraved her Auschwitz number (number 78651), the motto of the French Republic (liberté, égalité, fraternité) and the motto of the European Union, Unity in diversity (Unis dans la diversité).

Veil died at home on 30 June 2017, two weeks before her 90th birthday.
Her son Jean said at her public ceremony on 5 July, "I forgive you for having poured water over my head", in reference to an event where she had emptied a carafe of water over his head in disgust at what she considered to be his misogynist remarks.

On 5 July 2017, Veil was honoured with a national ceremony and military honours in les Invalides courtyard, after which she was interred next to her husband, who died in 2013, at Montparnasse Cemetery. The ceremony at les Invalides was attended by President Macron, Holocaust survivors, politicians and dignitaries.

Honours

National honours 
 Grand Cross of the Legion of Honour (2012).
 Knight of the Ordre National du Mérite (2001)
 Medal of Honor for Health and Social Affairs (2012)

Foreign honours
 : Grand Cross of the Order of the Southern Cross (1978)
 : Grand Officier of the Order of Valour (1982)
 : Knight Commander of the Order of Merit of the Federal Republic of Germany (1975)
 : Grand Officier of the Order of Ivory Merit (1978)
  : Grand Cross of the Order of the Three Stars (2007)
  : Grand Cross of the Order of Merit of the Grand Duchy of Luxembourg (1978)
: Commander of the Order of Ouissam Alaouite (1978)
 : Grand Cross of the Order of Prince Henry (1993)
  : Grand Cross of the Order of Merit (1987)
 : Grand Officier of the National Order of the Lion (1978)
 : Grand Officier of the Order of the Republic (1977)
 : Dame Commander of the Order of the British Empire (1998)

Awards
The following is a list of honours and awards received by Simone Veil.

 In 2005 she was awarded the Prince of Asturias Award in International Cooperation.
 In 2007 she was awarded the North-South Prize of the Council of Europe.
 In 2008 she won the Charles V Prize, awarded by the Fundación Academia Europea de Yuste in honour of "her acknowledged merits in the struggle for the advancement of women's equality."
 In 2010 she received the Coudenhove-Kalergi Badge by the Europa-Union Münster.
 2011 Schiller Prize of the City of Marbach
 She was a jury member for the Conflict Prevention Prize awarded every year by the Fondation Chirac.
 In 2018 she was the subject of a €2 commemorative coin, which design included her deportation registration number, the European Parliament and the year "1975" signifying the legalisation of abortion.

Honorary degrees

 Princeton University (United States), 1975 
 Weizmann Institute of Science (Israel), 1976 
 Bar-Ilan University (Israel), 1979 
 University of Cambridge (England), 1980 
 Hebrew University of Jerusalem (Israel), 1980 
 Yale University (United States), 1980 
 University of Edinburgh (Scotland), 1980 
 Georgetown University (Washington, DC, United States), 1981
 University of Urbino (Italy), 1981 
 University of Sussex (England), 1982 
 Yeshiva University of New York (United States), 1982 
 Université libre de Bruxelles (Belgium), 1984 
 American University of Paris (France), 1988 
 Brandeis University (United States), 1989 
 University of Glasgow (Scotland), 1995 
 University of Pennsylvania (United States), 1997 
 University of Cassino and Southern Lazio (Italy), 2006 
 Ben-Gurion University of the Negev (Israel), 2010

The Simone Veil Prize
In 2018, the government of France established a prize in memory of Veil to honour people who fight for women's causes. The intent is to draw attention to efforts in promoting women's autonomy, education, participation in leadership roles, and freedom from violence and discrimination. The prize is awarded each year on 8 March, International Women's Day, with €100,000 to support work in the winner's area of concern. On 8 March 2019, the first Simone Veil Prize was awarded to Aissa Doumara Ngatansou, co-founder of the Association for the Elimination of Violence against Women (ALVF) in Cameroon.

Publications

References

Sources

External links
 

|-

|-

|-

|-

|-

|-

|-

1927 births
2017 deaths
Burials at the Panthéon, Paris
20th-century French Jews
European integration pioneers
French people of German-Jewish descent
Auschwitz concentration camp survivors
Bergen-Belsen concentration camp survivors
Knights of the Ordre national du Mérite
20th-century women MEPs for France
French humanists
French feminists
French Ministers of Health
French abortion-rights activists
Grand Officiers of the Légion d'honneur
Honorary Dames Commander of the Order of the British Empire
Jewish feminists
Members of the Académie Française
MEPs for France 1979–1984
MEPs for France 1984–1989
MEPs for France 1989–1994
People from Nice
Politicians of the French Fifth Republic
Presidents of the European Parliament
Sciences Po alumni
Union for French Democracy MEPs
Union of Democrats and Independents politicians
Women government ministers of France
Advocates of women's reproductive rights
French disability rights activists
HIV/AIDS activists
Mothers' rights
20th-century French women lawyers
20th-century French lawyers
French women writers
21st-century French women
Jewish women politicians
Jewish women activists
French Holocaust survivors